Radio Tunis called Tunisian National Radio or Radio of Tunisia, founded in October 1938, is the primary radio station of Tunisia whose offices are located at Tunis.

History

Background 
The broadcasting was developed lately in Tunisia with the appearance of private stations broadcasting from Sfax and Bizerte from 1935 and Tunis from 1937. Philippe Soupault served as the director between 1937 and 1940. The radio's co-tenant inclines listeners to connect to the BBC Radio Rome, Toulouse Radio, Radio Algiers Radio Paris or Radio Bari.

Filmography 
 Philippe Soupault à Tunis, film de Frédéric Mitterrand, Les Films F.M., Paris, 1996

See also

References

External links 
 Page de Radio Tunis (Radio tunisienne)

Mass media in Tunis
Radio stations in Tunisia
Radio stations established in 1938